A Brief Inquiry into Online Relationships is the third studio album by English band the 1975. It was released on 30 November 2018 by Dirty Hit and Polydor Records. Initially titled Music for Cars, the album was intended as the follow-up to I Like It When You Sleep, for You Are So Beautiful yet So Unaware of It (2016). The term later denoted an era encompassing both their third album and Notes on a Conditional Form, released in 2020. The band halted recording of the first part after lead singer Matthew Healy left for a drug rehabilitation clinic in Barbados, seeking treatment for his heroin addiction. Following the singer's return, the band spent several months completing the album in Northamptonshire and Los Angeles.

A maximalist experimental album, A Brief Inquiry into Online Relationships combines rock and pop music interspersed with ambient interludes. Eschewing the 1980s-influenced sound of its predecessor, the album embraces a desolate soundscape informed by electronica. Noted for its incorporation of various genres, the record heavily draws from jazz, R&B, electropop, indie rock and Britpop, among others. The songs are characterised by their electronic beats, gospel choirs, neo-soul horns and downtempo rhythms. Guest contributions are featured from the London Community Gospel Choir, No Rome, the Japanese House and Roy Hargrove.

Exploring the role of digital communication and the internet in contemporary life, A Brief Inquiry into Online Relationships is a concept album connected by several over-arching threads. The album serves as a cautionary political statement,  questioning the implications of society's relationship with technology and its impact on millennials. It marks a shift in Healy's portrayal of heroin addiction, embracing sincerity and honesty to speak on the desolation it causes. Eschewing metaphors and ambiguity, the album utilises black humour, simple lyrics and straightforward storytelling, covering dark topics such as nihilism, suicide, depression, anxiety, dissociation, trauma, cynicism and death, among others.

A Brief Inquiry into Online Relationships was preceded by the singles "Give Yourself a Try", "Love It If We Made It", "TooTimeTooTimeTooTime", "Sincerity Is Scary" and "It's Not Living (If It's Not with You)". The album received widespread acclaim from contemporary music critics, who praised the production quality and portrayal of modern life, with some critics calling it a millennial version of Radiohead's OK Computer. In addition to appearing on numerous publications' year-end and decade-end lists, it won the British Album of the Year at the 2019 Brit Awards. The album became the 1975's third consecutive number one on the UK Albums Chart, and was later certified gold by the British Phonographic Industry (BPI). It also peaked at number four on the US Billboard 200 chart and attained top-ten positions in several countries, including on Ireland, New Zealand and Australia. To further promote the album, the band embarked on their Music for Cars Tour.

Background 
The 1975 released their second studio album, I Like It When You Sleep, for You Are So Beautiful yet So Unaware of It, in February 2016. The record peaked atop the UK Albums Chart and the US Billboard 200 and was considered by numerous critics to be one of the best albums of 2016. In February 2017, lead singer Matthew Healy tweeted: "Music For Cars – 2018". In an April interview on Zane Lowe's Beats 1 Radio show, the singer confirmed the title Music For Cars and announced a 2018 release, saying "[the album] has always been called that, and we were always gonna do a trilogy of records". He later told Tom Connick of NME that the title was a reference to the band's third extended play of the same name (2013), saying it "was always my favorite title of everything we'd ever done". With Music For Cars, the singer aimed to create the most important pop album of the decade, hoping to achieve the same impact as Radiohead's OK Computer (1997) and the Smiths' The Queen Is Dead (1986).

In August 2017, the 1975 stated they were in the editing process of Music For Cars, having over two hours worth of material, while the band's manager Jamie Osborn said the first recording sessions for the album were planned for September. Posters promoting the album began emerging around London and Manchester in April 2018. In May, the 1975 announced that Music For Cars would now serve as an umbrella term to denote an "era" comprising two albums: A Brief Inquiry into Online Relationships and Notes on a Conditional Form (2020). The title of the former is taken from Gene McHugh's essay The Context of the Digital: A Brief Inquiry Into Online Relationships. While on a train in London, Healy spotted a passenger reading You Are Here: Art After the Internet by Omar Kholeif, in which the essay is included. Regarding the decision to release two separate bodies of work rather than a double album, Healy called the double album format "prog and annoying... they're self-serving".

Recording and development 
In July 2017, the 1975's drummer and co-producer George Daniel discovered Healy was using heroin again, only hours before performing at the Latitude Festival. The band held an intervention afterward, and the singer promised to detox once they traveled to Los Angeles to record A Brief Inquiry into Online Relationships. The initial recording sessions began in August at the Angelic Residential Recording Studio in Northamptonshire. In September, the singer went on a tirade while under the influence of benzodiazepine, proclaiming he would continue to smoke heroin while telling the band members: "Listen, everyone has to get onboard because I'm the fucking main deal. If you want songs, we're just going to have to get on with it." Realising the seriousness of his actions, Healy declared his intention to enter a drug rehabilitation centre and treat his heroin addiction. The 1975 travelled to Los Angeles the following month, recording at the Sunset Marqui until Halloween, when Healy left to seek treatment at a rehab in Barbados.

Healy spent seven weeks in Barbados between November and December, an experience which inspired several songs on A Brief Inquiry into Online Relationships; he used songwriting as a means of catharsis that allowed him to gain a sense of purpose and wellbeing. The singer wrote "Surrounded by Heads and Bodies" about Angela, a woman he met in rehab. Although the pair rarely interacted, he felt a connection with her, and a later conversation revealed they lived on the same street in Manchester. The song's title stems from David Foster Wallace's Infinite Jest (1996), which Healy read during his time in Barbados. "I Couldn't Be More In Love" was also inspired by the experience, with the singer saying it is "not about love at all", but rather explores "being terrified of what happens when people stop caring". Healy and Daniel remained in contact during his time in rehab, which represented the longest time the two had spent apart, and the latter said: "It was a worrying time, because we’re so symbiotic, there can’t be problems like that."

While much of A Brief Inquiry into Online Relationships was written prior to Healy's stay in Barbados, the 1975 returned to the Northamptonshire studio in January 2018, where they remained for seven months. The singer told Indran Paramasivam of Bandwagon that the studio was chosen due to its seclusion and resemblance to his childhood farmhouse in Cheshire. Elsewhere in the UK, the band recorded sessions at various studios in London, including Abbey Road Studios with the London Community Gospel Choir. In late July, the 1975 returned to Los Angeles for four months to finalise the record and start working on Notes on a Conditional Form. Although the band worked on both albums simultaneously, Healy did not want to preserve any songs for Notes on a Conditional Form. During this period, the band lived and worked at Perfect Sound, a residential recording studio. Unlike the 1975's prior albums, it is the first not to be co-produced by Mike Crossey. Healy said that Crossey helped the band build confidence as producers with their first two albums; teaching them how to use a studio, how to record and guide the development their craft. Owing to the variety of recording locations utilised for A Brief Inquiry into Online Relationships, Healy felt that it was not "really conducive to have another element in there".

Musical style 
A musically experimental album, A Brief Inquiry into Online Relationships combines rock and pop music. Maura Johnston of Rolling Stone said its juxtaposition of various genres mirrors a music streaming playlist where "sophistipop fades into jazz fades into big-ticket MOR fades into Quiet Storm". The Daily Telegraphs Neil McCormick observed a "kaleidoscopic" variety of styles that reflects the album's engagement with contemporary culture and noted the presence of aesthetically unifying lyrical, vocal and instrumental factors. Writing that the record combines a "strange" mix of tones, genres and production into a singular aesthetic, Mike Watkins of Clash opined that it continues the experimental progression of I Like It When You Sleep, for You Are So Beautiful yet So Unaware of It. Writing for The Skinny, Harry Harris noted "a lot more lush, Postal Service-y electronica, and dreamy, cinematic collage-like phrases and choices", deeming the music a departure from the 1980s-style of the record's predecessor. Claire Biddles from The Line of Best Fit also felt the album is a musical departure from the band's second record, asserting that it eschews the "sunset pinks" and "pool blues" of their second album in favour of "a desolate sonic world".

Chris Conaton of PopMatters, The Ringer's editorial staff and NME writer Dan Stubbs deemed the record "genre-hopping". Aimee Cliff of Dazed deemed it "an effervescent and experimental record", while Tampa Bay Times writer Jay Cridlin called the album a "lavish and experimental blockbuster". Writing for Paste, Marissa Matazzo said the album blends indie rock and electronic elements, while Conrad Duncan of Under the Radar classified the record as indie rock which incorporates jazz-rap, pop-reggaeton, "Gershwin balladry", IDM and Britpop. Thrillist writer Dan Jackson felt the album is rooted in electropop and R&B, with Ian Gormely of Exclaim! also calling it an electropop album. Sputnikmusic staff writer SowingSeason classified the album's musical style as a fusion of jazz, electronica, rock and pop, with Andrew Sacher of BrooklynVegan calling the use of the former genre "the most surprising twist on [the] album".

Interspersed with ambient interludes, the maximalist songs on A Brief Inquiry into Online Relationships are characterised by spaced-out electronic beats and flourishes, gospel choirs, saxophones, neo-soul horns, light piano, 1980s synths, "jaunty" melodies and downtempo rhythms. Healy's vocals are autotuned and distorted for much of the record, and he delivers the lyrics in a stream-of-consciousness style. The album features contributions from several guest collaborators. The London Community Gospel Choir provides choir vocals on "Love It If We Made It", "Sincerity Is Scary", "It's Not Living (If It's Not with You)" and "I Couldn't Be More in Love". Roy Hargrove performs the trumpet on "Sincerity Is Scary" and "Mine". Guendoline Rome Viray Gomez—known professionally as No Rome—co-wrote "TooTimeTooTimeTooTime" and performs the song's background vocals, drums, synthesiser and programming. Elsewhere, he provides the keyboards and programming for "Sincerity Is Scary" and the background vocals on "I Like America & America Likes Me". Amber Bain–known professionally as the Japanese House–contributes to "It's Not Living (If It's Not with You)", singing the background vocals in addition to performing the keyboard and electric guitar.

Themes and lyrics 
A concept album, A Brief Inquiry into Online Relationships explores digital communication and the internet's role in contemporary life. Several over-arching narratives connect the record: society's relationship with technology, the millennial experience in the information age, and Healy's commitment to sincerity following the end of his heroin addiction. Healy compared the album to an essay meant to inform the listener without opinion or judgement, consciously avoiding portraying a dystopian society. The record eschews condescension and generalisation in an attempt to embrace contemporary life, utilising straightforward storytelling and simple lyrics that omit metaphors and ambiguity. Sacher observed a dark, conversational-style delivery that mimics a Twitter feed. For this reason, Cliff compared its structure to a newsfeed where "love and politics and comedy and culture all fight for attention".

Rather than condemn and judge humanity's increasingly dependent relationship with technology, information and the internet, A Brief Inquiry into Online Relationships accepts their ubiquity and debates it by posing a series of new questions. The album questions whether honest interpersonal communication can survive in the digital era and examines trust in the internet age, the overstimulation of infinite content loops, confirmation bias, how people communicate with one another and the mania of the online world. Biddles opined that the album is "ostensibly about the internet's role in our lives", writing it continues the band's exploration of how people connect and what messages are lost through digital communications. Writing for Atwood Magazine, Sara Santora felt the record reflects the effects of social media addiction and the 24-hour news cycle on youth culture, causing millennials to be "constantly concerned with the state of our world".

A Brief Inquiry into Online Relationships attempts to document the millennial experience in the information age, serving as a cautionary political statement about modern society and contemporary existence. It avoids lambasting the "largely misunderstood generation", according to David Sackllah of Consequence, and instead showcases their achievement, wit and humanity. It reflects geopolitics, nihilism, ageing, the passage of time and the challenges faced by young people in society; searching for hope and authenticity, navigating life in a technologically advanced future, understanding their role in society, and their ability—or inability—to promote change. It also deals with the psychological impact of inheriting a global recession, climate change, xenophobia, the War On Terror, dying industries and society on the brink of collapse. Regarding the impact of these events on the album's themes and lyrics, Stereogums Ryan Leas said it depicts: "The static, the paralysis, the disenchantment, the fury, the dislocation, produced by a world that seems to be falling apart and the way the internet brings that right up to our faces constantly."

Abandoning postmodern irony and embracing sincerity, A Brief Inquiry into Online Relationships marks a definitive shift toward an honest dialogue about Healy's sobriety and recovery. Although reluctant to speak on his addiction, the singer did not want to romanticise or trivialise it and sought to avoid the "clichéd myth of the countercultural rebel junkie", using the lyrics to deter any fetishisation of his struggle. David Greene of NPR identified Healy's experience with heroin addiction and rehab as the album's "true focal point", while Biddles attributed the new commitment to sincerity to Healy's time in rehab. Throughout the album, Healy focuses on drug addiction and the desolation that it causes, using black humour to tell sordid stories that deal with millennial self-destruction. Writing for The Irish Times, Louise Bruton described the record as "[wandering] through the various darkened states of isolation until it finds faint glimmers of light to reach out for", covering dark subjects such as suicide, depression, anxiety, dissociation, trauma, disillusionment, self-loathing, cynicism and death.

Songs 

A sparse ambient, folk and electronic instrumental, "The 1975", serves as the intro of A Brief Inquiry into Online Relationships. "Give Yourself a Try", a lo-fi indie rock and post-punk song, encourages people to recognise their self-worth. Exploring how social media affects modern-day relationships, "TooTimeTooTimeTooTime" is an electropop and synth-pop track with a tropical house beat. Characterised by minimal lyrics which detail how Healy lied to his friends amid his addiction, "How to Draw / Petrichor" is a two-part experimental, electronica, ambient and UK garage interlude. The first part, "How to Draw", contains twinkling synths, a ringing music box, delicate embers of sound, an ethereal mixture of noises and a toy piano. It gradually builds, adding vocoded vocals before transitioning into the electro-industrial "Petrichor". The second half is built upon a dance beat and contains glitching electronics, a programmed drum beat, house-inspired vocals and elements of ska, before concluding with sparse piano chords in a techno outro. "Love It If We Made It" is an electro-rock ballad that deals with the vices of modern humanity, hypocrisy and disinformation. An acoustic song, "Be My Mistake", details unfaithfulness while on tour.

"Sincerity Is Scary", the seventh song on A Brief Inquiry into Online Relationships, reflects on modern communication problems and valuing irony over honesty, and is composed as an experimental neo soul, R&B and neo jazz ballad. Addressing gun control, "I Like America & America Likes Me" is an experimental electronic and alternative R&B power ballad. Siri performs the album's ambient spoken word intermission, "The Man Who Married a Robot / Love Theme", a satirical poem about society's willingness to sacrifice human connection for virtual gratification. The cautionary tale focuses on a lonely internet troll named SnowflakeSmasher86, who retreats into the internet; his only friend. The man falls in love with the internet and later dies, with Siri saying, "You can find him on Facebook", and the song transitions into an orchestral theme. A torch song, "Inside Your Mind", is composed as a sparse post-rock, noise pop, indie rock and downtempo power ballad. The lyrics alternate between love and violence, describing a desire to know the thoughts of a romantic partner.

A Brief Inquiry into Online Relationshipss 11th song, "It's Not Living (If It's Not with You)", is a pop, synth-rock and power pop track that draws parallels between heartbreak and addiction. "Surrounded by Heads and Bodies", an experimental indie rock and acoustic interlude, is a poem directed toward Angela that reflects upon Healy's time in rehab. Containing a stripped-back production, it has a loose composition that experiments with structure, eschewing a chorus in favour of a time-shifting drum beat. "Mine" is a jazz and lounge ballad which discusses a fear of commitment and fighting crime online, featuring brushed drums and a trumpet solo by Hargrove. A synth-pop, R&B and soft rock slow jam, "I Couldn't Be More in Love" is a power ballad containing keyboards and a choral backing from the London Community Gospel Choir. Lyrically, the song addresses the co-dependence between the band and their fanbase. The album's final song, "I Always Wanna Die (Sometimes)" is an experimental Britpop power ballad that details Healy's struggles with suicidal thoughts and offers honest reasons why suicide is not the answer.

Release and promotion 

The 1975 announced the release date of A Brief Inquiry into Online Relationships and its tracklist on 10 September 2018. The band unveiled the album's artwork on social media the same day; it is a sparse and minimalist image containing tiny, colourful squares. Unlike the 1975's prior records, the artwork does not feature the band's signature rectangular box design. While some of the band's fanbase expressed their disappointment over its omission, Shahlin Graves of Coup de Main noted that various rectangles could be created by connecting the small squares. A Brief Inquiry into Online Relationships was officially released by Dirty Hit and Polydor Records on 30 November 2018.

To further promote the album, the 1975 embarked on the Music for Cars Tour. The UK and Ireland leg began in January 2019 and featured supporting acts No Rome and Pale Waves. Consisting of 22 shows, a North American leg of the tour began in Guadalajara on 20 March and concluded on 3 June in Toronto. Throughout the summer and fall of 2019, the band continued to perform throughout Europe, the Middle East and Oceania, beginning on 11 July in Trenčín and ending on 27 October in Perth. The 1975 returned to the US for a second leg of the tour, beginning in Camden on 16 November and concluding in Broomfield on 1 December. The planned second European leg of the Music for Cars Tour was postponed until October 2020 due to the band needing to complete the recording of Notes on a Conditional Form. It was deferred a second time to February 2021, due to the COVID-19 pandemic, while the third North American leg was suspended indefinitely. On 12 January 2021, the 1975 announced that the Music for Cars Tour would not resume.

Singles 
"Give Yourself a Try" was released as the lead single from A Brief Inquiry into Online Relationships on 31 May 2018. An accompanying music video, directed by Diane Martel, was released on the same day. The visual features the 1975 performing the song in a mirrored room. The track was certified silver by the British Phonographic Industry (BPI), denoting sales of over 200,000 units in the UK, and earned a nomination for Best Rock Song at the 62nd Annual Grammy Awards in 2020. "Love It If We Made It" was released as the album's second single on 19 July. An accompanying music video, directed by Adam Powell, was released on 15 October. The visual depicts the 1975 performing the song as neon-coloured silhouettes, interspersed with found footage-style clips of war and significant pop culture events from the 2010s. The song was certified silver by the BPI and later won the 2019 Ivor Novello Award for Best Contemporary Song.

On 15 August 2018, "TooTimeTooTimeTooTime" was released as the third single from A Brief Inquiry into Online Relationships. An accompanying music video, depicting Healy and an array of people calmly singing the song's lyrics in front of different coloured backdrops, was released on 29 August 2018. The song was certified gold by the BPI, denoting sales of over 400,000 units in the UK. "Sincerity Is Scary" was released as the album's fourth single on 13 September. An accompanying music video, directed by Warren Fu, was released on 21 November. Inspired by classic musical films, the visual features numerous references and easter eggs related to the 1975's previous works. The video was met with a positive response and was deemed one of the best visuals of 2018 by Wonderland, Stereogum, NME, Billboard and HuffPost. The song was certified silver by the BPI. "It's Not Living (If It's Not with You)" was released as the album's fifth and final single on 18 October 2018. The song's music video, directed by Fu, was released on 13 December 2018. The visual is a tribute to the Talking Heads' concert film Stop Making Sense (1984). The song was certified silver by the BPI.

Commercial performance 
A Brief Inquiry into Online Relationships debuted at number one on the UK Albums Chart with 50,000 album-equivalent units sold, becoming the 1975's third consecutive record to top the chart. It later ranked at number 85 on the chart's 2018 year-end edition and number 54 on its 2019 year-end edition. In Scotland, the album peaked at number one on the Scottish Albums Chart. It was later certified gold by the BPI, denoting sales of over 100,000 units in the UK. Elsewhere in Europe, the album reached number four in Ireland, number 13 in Latvia, number 16 in Sweden, number 36 in the Netherlands, number 44 in Flanders, number 57 in Germany, number 61 in Austria, number 62 in Spain, number 89 in Switzerland and number 178 in Wallonia. In the US, A Brief Inquiry into Online Relationships peaked at number four on the Billboard 200 chart and number one on the Billboard Top Rock Albums chart, while it later ranked at number 49 on the latter chart's 2019 year-end edition. Elsewhere in North America, the album peaked at number 15 on the Billboard Canadian Albums Chart. In Asia, A Brief Inquiry into Online Relationships reached number 24 on the Billboard Japan Hot Albums chart, number 39 in Japan and number 51 in South Korea. In Oceania, the album peaked at number four in Australia and number nine in New Zealand.

Reception

Critical response 

A Brief Inquiry into Online Relationships was met with acclaim from contemporary music critics. Aggregating website Metacritic reports a normalised rating of 83, based on 29 critical reviews, indicating "universal acclaim". The website later ranked it as the 19th best-reviewed album of 2018. AnyDecentMusic? gave it 8.0 out of 10, based on their assessment of the critical consensus.

In a perfect five-star review, Harris praised Daniel's "beautiful" production and the musical variation present throughout A Brief Inquiry into Online Relationships, ultimately deeming it a "considered, ambitious album from a band who are constantly pushing themselves". Ross Horton of musicOMH similarly praised the album's ambition, saying: "Nobody makes things this brave anymore." Pitchforks Ryan Dombal highlighted the record's "boundless sense of style", writing that Daniel and Healy's production feels "more purposeful" than that of I Like It When You Sleep, for You Are So Beautiful yet So Unaware of It. Gormely commended the 1975's ability to incorporate retro and contemporary influences to create music that sounds "new and familiar", and said their willingness to "fall flat on their face" distinguishes them from the "inoffensiveness of their pop peers". AllMusic's Matt Collar said the album's disparate sound works for individual songs, but as an album, it is "difficult to wade through as the social-media landscape it hopes to comment on". Conaton similarly dismissed the "scattershot" musical approach, writing the band "[throws] everything they can at the listener, and most of it just doesn’t stick".

Awarding A Brief Inquiry into Online Relationships a perfect five-star review, DIYs Will Richards deemed it a "bombastic, immaculately put together portrait of modern life", writing that the album's themes and lyrics transmit the feelings of youth culture. McCormick also commended Healy's songwriting, noting that the singer "easily [shifts] from witty sloganeering to tender confessional", while saying a "tone of urgent honesty pulses through the album, a visceral need to connect". Biddles lauded the record's exploration of relationships, writing that Healy displays "such a deep understanding of the small cruelties and vulnerabilities that punctuate our communication". Kitty Empire of The Observer praised the album for transforming "cliche-ridden topics" into "thoughtful" mainstream pop music. Describing the record as "stunning", Johnston highlighted its ability to portray important modern issues with humour and mournfulness, saying the album combines "fist-raising inspired by anthems with the gut-punch provided by precisely described longing". Writing for the Los Angeles Times, Mikael Wood wrote that despite being an "excellent [and] often thrilling" record that demonstrates Healy's understanding of such issues, the singer fails to recognise that he is "also more of a contributor than he likely realizes".

A Brief Inquiry into Online Relationships has frequently been referred to as a millennial version of OK Computer, with numerous critics drawing comparisons between the two records. Addressing the similarities in his review of the former album for The Boston Globe, Issac Feldberg felt it does not share the same sense of "doom and gloom" as OK Computer, and instead projects "its vision of life in the information age [as] too textured, too lived-in, to indulge the same shallow sanctimony that's hamstrung recent, analogous efforts by other artists". Hailing the record as "the millennial answer to OK Computer" in his perfect five-star review, Stubbs noted that OK Computer was created when the internet was seen as a "luxury", while four "digital natives" created a Brief Inquiry into Online Relationships. In his review of the album, Stephen Ackroyd of Dork declared it a "generation-defining masterpiece" reminiscent of both OK Computer and its followup Kid A (2000). When asked by Matt Wilkinson of Beats 1 Radio about the similarities, Healy said: "I'm so humbled. It's amazing but strange also."

Accolades 
A Brief Inquiry into Online Relationships placed 26th on Metacritic's list of the best-received albums of 2018, based on inclusions in mainstream publications' year-end lists. The album ranked at number 14 on The Village Voices annual Pazz & Jop mass critics' poll for 2018. A Brief Inquiry into Online Relationships also placed eighth on Uproxx's 2018 mass critics' poll. Regarding reception from music audiences, NPR listeners voted the record as the 11th-most popular album of 2018. On Pitchforks 2018 Readers' Poll, the record was voted the 14th-best album of the year. A Brief Inquiry into Online Relationships won the award for British Album of the Year at the 2019 Brit Awards. The album was nominated for the 2019 Mercury Prize, which went to Dave's Psychodrama. Additionally, the record received a nomination for Best Album at the Q Awards.

Track listing

Personnel 
Credits adapted from A Brief Inquiry into Online Relationships album liner notes.

The 1975
 George Daniel – programming , synthesiser programming , drums , synthesiser , keyboards , percussion , background vocals , piano 
 Adam Hann – guitar 
 Matthew Healy – vocals , piano , guitar , keyboards , background vocals , drums , acoustic guitar 
 Ross MacDonald – bass guitar , double bass 

Additional musicians

 Guendoline Rome Viray Gomez – background vocals , drums , programming , synthesiser , keyboards 
 Amber Bain - background vocals, keyboard, electric guitar 
 The London Community Gospel Choir – choir vocals 
 Dave Fuest – basset clarinet 
 Gavin McNaughton – bassoon 
 David Stewart – bass trombone 
 Chris Allan – cello 
 Chris Worsey – cello 
 Ian Burdge – cello 
 Sophie Harris – cello 
 Jon Carnac – clarinet 
 Sam Swallow – conductor, piano, and recording arranger 
 Chris Laurence – double bass 
 Stacey Watton – double bass 
 Paul Edmund Davies – flute 
 John Ryan – French horn 
 Richard Berry – French horn 
 Skaila Kanga – harp 
 Gareth Hulse – oboe 
 Chris Baron – percussion 
 Frank Ricotti – percussion 
 Clare Jeffries – piccolo 
 Andy Wool – trombone 
 Ed Tarrant – trombone 
 Andy Crowley – trumpet 
 James Fountain – trumpet 
 Andy Parker – viola 
 Helen Kamminga – viola 
 Martin Humbey – viola 
 Peter Lale – viola 
 Rachel Bolt – viola 
 Debbie Widdup – violin 
 Emil Chakalov – violin 
 Everton Nelson – violin 
 Kate Robinson – violin 
 Kathy Gowers – violin 
 Matt Ward – violin 
 Natalia Bonner – violin 
 Oli Langford – violin 
 Patrick Kiernan – violin 
 Perry Montague-Mason – violin 
 Rita Manning – violin 
 Simon Baggs – violin 
 Sonia Slany – violin 
 Tom Pigott-Smith – violin 
 Roy Hargrove – trumpet 
 Derek Stein – cello 
 Rudolph Stein – cello 
 David Campbell – conductor, piano, and string arranger 
 Luke Maurer – viola 
 Thomas Lea – viola 
 Mario De Leon – violin 
 Michele Richards – violin 
 Nina Evtuhov – violin 
 Sara Parkins – violin 
 Songa Lee – violin 

Technical
 Robin Schmidt – mastering engineer
 Mike Crossey – mixer , engineer 
 Manny Marroquin – mixing 
 Jonathan Gilmore – engineer 
 Luke Gibbs – engineer , assistant recording engineer 
 Travis Warner – engineer 
 Nick Rives – assistant recording engineer 

Art direction
 Samuel Burgess-Johnson
 Matthew Healy

Charts

Weekly charts

Year-end charts

Certifications

References 

2018 albums
Brit Award for British Album of the Year
Concept albums
Contemporary R&B albums by English artists
Electropop albums
Polydor Records albums
Pop albums by English artists
Rock albums by English artists
The 1975 albums